Tuition.io is an American company that enables other companies to provide employer-paid student loan contributions as an employee benefit. The company is headquartered in Santa Monica, California.

Tuition.io's customers include Fidelity Investments, Chegg, and Staples.  More than 5,000 Fidelity employees, or about 11 percent of its workforce, signed up in the first three months of the program.

Tuition.io raised $8.2 million in funding in 2015.

History 
Tuition.io was founded by Brendon McQueen (Founder) and Steve Pomerantz (Co-Founder/President) in 2012. An alum of the Launchpad LA startup accelerator, the company launched into public beta in January 2013. Current CEO is since 2016 Scott Thompson. Since August 2017, Scott Simmons is CFO and COO of the company.

Products 
Tuition.io offers student loan management tools, student loan repayment assistance, tuition assistance, so that clients can offer tuition reimbursement or scholarship programs, and they provide Public Service Loan Forgiveness Tools.

References

External links 

Internet properties established in 2012
Companies based in Santa Monica, California